Big CC Racing is a motorcycle tuning company based in Wokingham, United Kingdom, specialising in custom turbo applications for Suzuki Hayabusa and other motorcycle models.

In 2014, Sean Mills entered the Summer Nationals at Santa Pod Raceway with his Suzuki Hayabusa, where he later set a record in the Competition Bike class in 2017. From 2015 to 2020, Sean Mills made a name for himself in racing under 8.0 seconds.

Big CC Racing creates high performance, but also supports sensible turbo systems for the road with technical knowledge.

Other achievements
Sean Mills may have built the fastest street legal Hayabusa in the world.

References

External links
The World’s Most Powerful Streetbike Is Set To Wow Crowds At Turbo Dynamics’ Autosport Stand In The New Year, Turbo Dynamics

Automotive motorsports and performance companies
Companies based in Berkshire
British companies established in 1995